The Causey Way was an American punk/new wave group formed in 1997.

History
The underlying theme was that of a cult operating as a band  (with T-shirts coyly stating "The Causey Way Is Not A Cult"). The live shows were energetic and in the style of revivalist evangelism. With releases on Fueled By Ramen and Alternative Tentacles, they broke up in 2001. Several members have since regrouped and started Pilot Scott Tracy, also on Alternative Tentacles.

The Causey Way was the philosophy of Causey, the actual band was referred to as the ACE, (Aural Communications and Entertainment) and a division of the Causey Way as a whole. The ACE was the main entertainment at the Causey Compound which was where those that follow the Causey Way resided.

The Causey Way disbanded in 2001, claiming that Causey had been institutionalized and The Truth had converted to Scientology.

Discography
WWCD (Put it on a Cracker, 1998)
With Loving And Open Arms (Alternative Tentacles, 1999)
Testimony [EP] (Fueled by Ramen, 2000)
Causey Vs. Everything (Alternative Tentacles, 2001)

References

External links
 A Final Message From Causey
 The Causey Way on the Alternative Tentacles web page
 Causey Vs. Everything review (epitonic.com)
 The Causey Way biography on MTV.com
 "The Loving and Open Arms of The Causey Way" (ink19.com)
 [ The Causey Way on Allmusic.com]

Alternative Tentacles artists
American punk rock groups
Bands with fictional stage personas
Fueled by Ramen artists
Musical groups established in 1997